This is a list of the bird species recorded in Cyprus. The avifauna of Cyprus include a total of 421 species. Of these, 22 species are globally threatened.

This list's taxonomic treatment (designation and sequence of orders, families and species) and nomenclature (common and scientific names) follow the conventions of The Clements Checklist of Birds of the World, 2022 edition. The family accounts at the beginning of each heading reflect this taxonomy, as do the species counts found in each family account. Introduced and accidental species are included in the total counts for Cyprus.

The following tags have been used to highlight several categories. The commonly occurring native species do not fall into any of these categories.

 (A) Accidental - a species that rarely or accidentally occurs in Cyprus
 (E) Endemic - a species endemic to Cyprus
 (Ex) Extirpated - a species no longer found in Cyprus but found elsewhere

Ducks, geese, and waterfowl

Order: AnseriformesFamily: Anatidae

Anatidae includes the ducks and most duck-like waterfowl, such as geese and swans. These birds are adapted to an aquatic existence with webbed feet, bills which are flattened to a greater or lesser extent, and feathers that are excellent at shedding water due to special oils.

 Graylag goose, Anser anser
 Greater white-fronted goose, Anser albifrons 
 Lesser white-fronted goose, Anser erythropus (A)
 Brant, Branta bernicla (A)
 Red-breasted goose, Branta ruficollis (A)
 Mute swan, Cygnus olor (A)
 Tundra swan, Cygnus columbianus (A)
 Whooper swan, Cygnus cygnus (A)
 Egyptian goose, Alopochen aegyptiacus (A)
 Ruddy shelduck, Tadorna ferruginea
 Common shelduck, Tadorna tadorna 
 Garganey, Spatula querquedula 
 Northern shoveler, Spatula clypeata
 Gadwall, Mareca strepera
 Eurasian wigeon, Mareca penelope
 Mallard, Anas platyrhynchos 
 Northern pintail, Anas acute
 Green-winged teal, Anas crecca
 Marbled teal, Marmaronetta angustirostris (Ex)
 Red-crested pochard, Netta rufina 
 Common pochard, Aythya ferina
 Ferruginous duck, Aythya nyroca
 Tufted duck, Aythya fuligula
 Greater scaup, Aythya marila (A)
 Common scoter, Melanitta nigra (A)
 Common goldeneye, Bucephala clangula (A)
 Smew, Mergellus albellus (A)
 Common merganser, Mergus merganser (A)
 Red-breasted merganser, Mergus serrator (A)
 Ruddy duck, Oxyura jamaicensis (A)
 White-headed duck, Oxyura leucocephala (A)

Pheasants, grouse, and allies

Order: GalliformesFamily: Phasianidae

Phasianidae consists of the pheasants and their allies. These are terrestrial species, variable in size but generally plump with broad relatively short wings. Many species are gamebirds or have been domesticated as a food source for humans.

 Common quail, Coturnix coturnix
 Chukar, Alectoris chukar 
 Black francolin, Francolinus francolinus 
 Ring-necked pheasant, Phasianus colchicus

Flamingos
Order: PhoenicopteriformesFamily: Phoenicopteridae

Flamingos filter-feed on shellfish and algae. Their oddly shaped beaks are specially adapted to separate mud and silt from the food they consume and, uniquely, are used upside-down.

 Greater flamingo, Phoenicopterus roseus
 Lesser flamingo, Phoeniconaias minor (A)

Grebes

Order: PodicipediformesFamily: Podicipedidae

Grebes are small to medium-large freshwater diving birds. They have lobed toes and are excellent swimmers and divers. However, they have their feet placed far back on the body, making them quite ungainly on land.

 Little grebe, Tachybaptus ruficollis 
 Horned grebe, Podiceps auritus (A)
 Red-necked grebe, Podiceps grisegena (A)
 Great crested grebe, Podiceps cristatus 
 Eared grebe, Podiceps nigricollis

Pigeons and doves
Order: ColumbiformesFamily: Columbidae

Pigeons and doves are stout-bodied birds with short necks and short slender bills with a fleshy cere.

 Rock pigeon, Columba livia 
 Stock dove, Columba oenas (A)
 Common wood-pigeon, Columba palumbus 
 European turtle-dove, Streptopelia turtur
 Oriental turtle-dove, Streptopelia orientalis (A)
 Eurasian collared-dove, Streptopelia decaocto RB
 Laughing dove, Spilopelia senegalensis
 Namaqua dove, Oena capensis (A)

Sandgrouse
Order: PterocliformesFamily: Pteroclidae

Sandgrouse have small, pigeon-like heads and necks and sturdy compact bodies. The adults are sexually dimorphic with the males being slightly larger and more brightly colored than the females. They have eleven strong primary feathers and long pointed wings giving them a fast direct flight. The muscles of the wings are powerful and the birds are capable of rapid take off and sustained flight. There is a dense layer of under down which helps insulate the bird from extremes of heat and cold. The feathers of the belly are specially adapted for absorbing water and retaining it, allowing adults, particularly males, to carry water to chicks that may be many miles away from watering holes.

 Pin-tailed sandgrouse, Pterocles alchata (Ex)
 Black-bellied sandgrouse, Pterocles orientalis (Ex)

Bustards
Order: OtidiformesFamily: Otididae

Bustards are large terrestrial birds mainly associated with dry open country and steppes in the Old World. They are omnivorous and nest on the ground. They walk steadily on strong legs and big toes, pecking for food as they go. They have long broad wings with "fingered" wingtips, and striking patterns in flight. Many have interesting mating displays.

 Great bustard, Otis tarda (Ex)
 MacQueen's bustard, Chlamydotis macqueenii (Ex)
 Little bustard, Tetrax tetrax (Ex)

Cuckoos
Order: CuculiformesFamily: Cuculidae

The family Cuculidae includes cuckoos, roadrunners and anis. These birds are of variable size with slender bodies, long tails and strong legs.

 Great spotted cuckoo, Clamator glandarius
 Dideric cuckoo, Chrysococcyx caprius (A)
 Common cuckoo, Cuculus canorus

Nightjars and allies
Order: CaprimulgiformesFamily: Caprimulgidae

Nightjars are medium-sized nocturnal birds that usually nest on the ground. They have long wings, short legs and very short bills. Most have small feet, of little use for walking, and long pointed wings. Their soft plumage is cryptically coloured to resemble bark or leaves.

 Eurasian nightjar, Caprimulgus europaeus

Swifts
Order: CaprimulgiformesFamily: Apodidae

The swifts are small birds which spend the majority of their lives flying. These birds have very short legs and never settle voluntarily on the ground, perching instead only on vertical surfaces. Many swifts have long swept-back wings which resemble a crescent or boomerang.

 Alpine swift, Apus melba
 Common swift, Apus apus
 Pallid swift, Apus pallidus
 Little swift, Apus affinis

Rails, gallinules and coots
Order: GruiformesFamily: Rallidae

Rallidae is a large family of small to medium-sized birds which includes the rails, crakes, coots and gallinules. The most typical family members occupy dense vegetation in damp environments near lakes, swamps or rivers. In general they are shy and secretive birds, making them difficult to observe. Most species have strong legs and long toes which are well adapted to soft uneven surfaces. They tend to have short, rounded wings and to be weak fliers.

 Water rail, Rallus aquaticus 
 Corn crake, Crex crex (A)
 Spotted crake, Porzana porzana 
 Eurasian moorhen, Gallinula chloropus 
 Eurasian coot, Fulica atra 
 Allen's gallinule, Porphyrio alleni (A)
 Gray-headed swamphen, Porphyrio poliocephalus (A)
 Little crake, Zapornia parva 
 Baillon's crake, Zapornia pusilla (A)

Cranes
Order: GruiformesFamily: Gruidae

Cranes are large, long-legged and long-necked birds. Unlike the similar-looking but unrelated herons, cranes fly with necks outstretched, not pulled back. Most have elaborate and noisy courting displays or "dances".

 Demoiselle crane, Anthropoides virgo 
 Common crane, Grus grus

Thick-knees
Order: CharadriiformesFamily: Burhinidae

The thick-knees are a group of largely tropical waders in the family Burhinidae. They are found worldwide within the tropical zone, with some species also breeding in temperate Europe and Australia. They are medium to large waders with strong black or yellow-black bills, large yellow eyes and cryptic plumage. Despite being classed as waders, most species have a preference for arid or semi-arid habitats.

 Eurasian thick-knee, Burhinus oedicnemus

Stilts and avocets
  
Order: CharadriiformesFamily: Recurvirostridae

Recurvirostridae is a family of large wading birds, which includes the avocets and stilts. The avocets have long legs and long up-curved bills. The stilts have extremely long legs and long, thin, straight bills.

 Black-winged stilt, Himantopus himantopus 
 Pied avocet, Recurvirostra avosetta

Oystercatchers
Order: CharadriiformesFamily: Haematopodidae

The oystercatchers are large, obvious and noisy plover-like birds, with strong bills used for smashing or prising open molluscs.

 Eurasian oystercatcher, Haematopus ostralegus

Plovers and lapwings
Order: CharadriiformesFamily: Charadriidae

The family Charadriidae includes the plovers, dotterels and lapwings. They are small to medium-sized birds with compact bodies, short, thick necks and long, usually pointed, wings. They are found in open country worldwide, mostly in habitats near water.

 Black-bellied plover, Pluvialis squatarola 
 European golden-plover, Pluvialis apricaria
 Pacific golden-plover, Pluvialis fulva (A)
 Northern lapwing, Vanellus vanellus 
 Spur-winged lapwing, Vanellus spinosus 
 Sociable lapwing, Vanellus gregarius (A)
 White-tailed lapwing, Vanellus leucurus (A)
 Greater sand-plover, Charadrius leschenaultii 
 Caspian plover, Charadrius asiaticus (A)
 Kittlitz's plover, Charadrius pecuarius (A)
 Kentish plover, Charadrius alexandrinus 
 Common ringed plover, Charadrius hiaticula
 Little ringed plover, Charadrius dubius 
 Eurasian dotterel, Charadrius morinellus

Sandpipers and allies
Order: CharadriiformesFamily: Scolopacidae

Scolopacidae is a large diverse family of small to medium-sized shorebirds including the sandpipers, curlews, godwits, shanks, tattlers, woodcocks, snipes, dowitchers and phalaropes. The majority of these species eat small invertebrates picked out of the mud or soil. Different lengths of legs and bills enable multiple species to feed in the same habitat, particularly on the coast, without direct competition for food.

 Whimbrel, Numenius phaeopus 
 Slender-billed curlew, Numenius tenuirostris (A)
 Eurasian curlew, Numenius arquata 
 Bar-tailed godwit, Limosa lapponica (A)
 Black-tailed godwit, Limosa limosa 
 Ruddy turnstone, Arenaria interpres
 Red knot, Calidris canutus (A)
 Ruff, Calidris pugnax
 Broad-billed sandpiper, Calidris falcinellus (A)
 Curlew sandpiper, Calidris ferruginea
 Temminck's stint, Calidris temminckii
 Sanderling, Calidris alba 
 Dunlin, Calidris alpina 
 Baird's sandpiper, Calidris bairdii (A)
 Little stint, Calidris minuta
 Pectoral sandpiper, Calidris melanotos (A)
 Jack snipe, Lymnocryptes minimus
 Eurasian woodcock, Scolopax rusticola 
 Great snipe, Gallinago media (A)
 Common snipe, Gallinago gallinago
 Terek sandpiper, Xenus cinereus (A)
 Red-necked phalarope, Phalaropus lobatus (A) 
 Red phalarope, Phalaropus fulicarius (A)
 Common sandpiper, Actitis hypoleucos 
 Green sandpiper, Tringa ochropus 
 Spotted redshank, Tringa erythropus
 Common greenshank, Tringa nebularia 
 Marsh sandpiper, Tringa stagnatilis 
 Wood sandpiper, Tringa glareola 
 Common redshank, Tringa totanus

Pratincoles and coursers
Order: CharadriiformesFamily: Glareolidae

Pratincoles have short legs, very long pointed wings and long forked tails. Their most unusual feature for birds classed as waders is that they typically hunt their insect prey on the wing like swallows, although they can also feed on the ground. Their short bills are an adaptation to aerial feeding.

 Cream-colored courser, Cursorius cursor 
 Collared pratincole, Glareola pratincola 
 Oriental pratincole, Glareola maldivarum (A)
 Black-winged pratincole, Glareola nordmanni (A)

Skuas and jaegers
Order: CharadriiformesFamily: Stercorariidae

Skuas are in general medium to large birds, typically with grey or brown plumage, often with white markings on the wings. They have longish bills with hooked tips, and webbed feet with sharp claws. They look like large dark gulls, but have a fleshy cere above the upper mandible. They are strong, acrobatic fliers.

 Pomarine jaeger, Stercorarius pomarinus (A)
 Parasitic jaeger, Stercorarius parasiticus (A)

Gulls, terns, and skimmers
Order: CharadriiformesFamily: Laridae

Laridae is a family of medium to large seabirds and includes gulls, terns, kittiwakes and skimmers. Gulls are typically grey or white, often with black markings on the head or wings. They have stout, longish bills and webbed feet. Terns are a group of generally medium to large seabirds typically with grey or white plumage, often with black markings on the head. Most terns hunt fish by diving but some pick insects off the surface of fresh water. Terns are generally long-lived birds, with several species known to live in excess of 30 years.

 Black-legged kittiwake, Rissa tridactyla (A)
 Slender-billed gull, Chroicocephalus genei 
 Black-headed gull, Chroicocephalus ridibundus
 Little gull, Hydrocoloeus minutus
 Franklin's gull, Leucophaeus pipixcan (A)
 Mediterranean gull, Ichthyaetus melanocephalus 
 White-eyed gull, Ichthyaetus leucophthalmus (A)
 Pallas's gull, Ichthyaetus ichthyaetus (A)
 Audouin's gull, Ichthyaetus audouinii
 Common gull, Larus canus 
 Herring gull, Larus argentatus (A)
 Yellow-legged gull, Larus michahellis 
 Caspian gull, Larus cachinnans 
 Armenian gull, Larus armenicus 
 Lesser black-backed gull, Larus fuscus
 Great black-backed gull, Larus marinus (A)
 Little tern, Sternula albifrons
 Gull-billed tern, Gelochelidon nilotica 
 Caspian tern, Hydroprogne caspia (A)
 Black tern, Chlidonias niger 
 White-winged tern, Chlidonias leucopterus
 Whiskered tern, Chlidonias hybrida
 Common tern, Sterna hirundo
 Arctic tern, Sterna paradisaea (A)
 Sandwich tern, Thalasseus sandvicensis

Loons 
Order: GaviiformesFamily: Gaviidae

Loons are aquatic birds the size of a large duck, to which they are unrelated. Their plumage is largely grey or black, and they have spear-shaped bills. Loons swim well and fly adequately, but, because their legs are placed towards the rear of the body, are almost helpless on land.

Red-throated loon, Gavia stellata (A)
Arctic loon, Gavia arctica (A)

Northern storm-petrels
Order: ProcellariiformesFamily: Hydrobatidae

The northern storm-petrels are the smallest seabirds, relatives of the petrels, feeding on planktonic crustaceans and small fish picked from the surface, typically while hovering. The flight is fluttering and sometimes bat-like.

 European storm-petrel, Hydrobates pelagicus (A)

Shearwaters and petrels

Order: ProcellariiformesFamily: Procellariidae

The procellariids are the main group of medium-sized "true petrels", characterised by united nostrils with medium septum, and a long outer functional primary.

 Cory's shearwater, Calonectris diomedea
 Yelkouan shearwater, Puffinus yelkouan

Storks

Order: CiconiiformesFamily: Ciconiidae

Storks are large, heavy, long-legged, long-necked wading birds with long stout bills and wide wingspans. They lack the powder down that other wading birds such as herons, spoonbills and ibises use to clean off fish slime. Storks lack a pharynx and are mute.

 Black stork, Ciconia nigra 
 White stork, Ciconia ciconia

Boobies and gannets
Order: SuliformesFamily: Sulidae

The sulids comprise the gannets and boobies. Both groups are medium-large coastal seabirds that plunge-dive for fish.

 Northern gannet, Morus bassanus (A)

Cormorants and shags
Order: SuliformesFamily: Phalacrocoracidae

Cormorants are medium-to-large aquatic birds, usually with mainly dark plumage and areas of coloured skin on the face. The bill is long, thin and sharply hooked. Their feet are four-toed and webbed, a distinguishing feature among the order Pelecaniformes.

 Pygmy cormorant, Microcarbo pygmeus (A)
 Great cormorant, Phalacrocorax carbo
 European shag, Gulosus aristotelis

Pelicans

Order: PelecaniformesFamily: Pelecanidae

Pelicans are very large water birds with a distinctive pouch under their beak. Like other birds in the order Pelecaniformes, they have four webbed toes.

 Great white pelican, Pelecanus onocrotalus
 Dalmatian pelican, Pelecanus crispus (A)

Herons, egrets, and bitternsOrder: PelecaniformesFamily: Ardeidae

The family Ardeidae contains the herons, egrets and bitterns. Herons and egrets are medium to large wading birds with long necks and legs. Bitterns tend to be shorter necked and more secretive. Members of Ardeidae fly with their necks retracted, unlike other long-necked birds such as storks, ibises and spoonbills.

 Great bittern, Botaurus stellaris
 Little bittern, Ixobrychus minutus 
 Gray heron, Ardea cinerea
 Purple heron, Ardea purpurea
 Great egret, Ardea alba
 Little egret, Egretta garzetta
 Western reef-heron, Egretta gularis (A)
 Cattle egret, Bubulcus ibis 
 Squacco heron, Ardeola ralloides
 Striated heron, Butorides striata (A)
 Black-crowned night-heron, Nycticorax nycticorax

Ibises and spoonbillsOrder: PelecaniformesFamily: Threskiornithidae

Members of this family have long, broad wings, are strong fliers and, rather surprisingly, given their size and weight, very capable soarers. The body tends to be elongated, the neck more so, with rather long legs. The bill is also long, decurved in the case of the ibises, straight and distinctively flattened in the spoonbills.

 Glossy ibis, Plegadis falcinellus
 Eurasian spoonbill, Platalea leucorodia

OspreyOrder: AccipitriformesFamily: Pandionidae

Pandionidae is a family of fish-eating birds of prey, possessing a very large, powerful hooked beak for tearing flesh from their prey, strong legs, powerful talons and keen eyesight. The family is monotypic.

 Osprey, Pandion haliaetus

Hawks, eagles, and kitesOrder: AccipitriformesFamily: Accipitridae

Accipitridae is a family of birds of prey, which includes eagles, hawks, kites, harriers and Old World vultures. These birds have very large powerful hooked beaks for tearing flesh from their prey, strong legs, powerful talons and keen eyesight.

 Black-winged kite, Elanus caeruleus (A)
 Bearded vulture, Gypaetus barbatus (A)
 Egyptian vulture, Neophron percnopterus
 European honey-buzzard, Pernis apivorus 
 Oriental honey-buzzard, Pernis ptilorhynchus (A)
 Cinereous vulture, Aegypius monachus 
 Eurasian griffon, Gyps fulvus 
 Bateleur, Terathopius ecaudatus (A)
 Short-toed snake-eagle, Circaetus gallicus (A)
 Lesser spotted eagle, Clanga pomarina (A)
 Greater spotted eagle, Clanga clanga (A)
 Booted eagle, Hieraaetus pennatus
 Imperial eagle, Aquila heliaca (Ex)
 Golden eagle, Aquila chrysaetos (A)
 Bonelli's eagle, Aquila fasciata 
 Eurasian marsh-harrier, Circus aeruginosus 
 Hen harrier, Circus cyaneus 
 Pallid harrier, Circus macrourus
 Montagu's harrier, Circus pygargus 
 Levant sparrowhawk, Accipiter brevipes (A)
 Eurasian sparrowhawk, Accipiter nisus 
 Northern goshawk, Accipiter gentiles 
 Red kite, Milvus milvus (A)
 Black kite, Milvus migrans 
 White-tailed eagle, Haliaeetus albicilla (A)
 Rough-legged hawk, Buteo lagopus (A)
 Common buzzard, Buteo buteo
 Long-legged buzzard, Buteo rufinus

Barn-owlsOrder: StrigiformesFamily: Tytonidae

Barn owls are medium to large owls with large heads and characteristic heart-shaped faces. They have long strong legs with powerful talons.

 Barn owl, Tyto alba

OwlsOrder: StrigiformesFamily: Strigidae

Typical owls are small to large solitary nocturnal birds of prey. They have large forward-facing eyes and ears, a hawk-like beak and a conspicuous circle of feathers around each eye called a facial disk.

 Eurasian scops-owl, Otus scops
 Cyprus scops-owl, Otus cyprius (E)
 Little owl, Athene noctua
 Long-eared owl, Asio otus
 Short-eared owl, Asio flammeus (A)

HoopoesOrder: UpupiformesFamily: Upupidae

This black, white and pink bird is quite unmistakable, especially in its erratic flight, which is like that of a giant butterfly. It is the only member of its family. The song is a trisyllabic oop-oop-oop, which gives rise to its English and scientific names.

 Eurasian hoopoe, Upupa epops

KingfishersOrder: CoraciiformesFamily: Alcedinidae

Kingfishers are medium-sized birds with large heads, long, pointed bills, short legs and stubby tails.

 Common kingfisher, Alcedo atthis 
 White-throated kingfisher, Halcyon smyrnensis (A)
 Pied kingfisher, Ceryle rudis (A)

Bee-eatersOrder: CoraciiformesFamily: Meropidae

The bee-eaters are a group of near passerine birds in the family Meropidae. Most species are found in Africa but others occur in southern Europe, Madagascar, Australia and New Guinea. They are characterised by richly coloured plumage, slender bodies and usually elongated central tail feathers. All are colourful and have long downturned bills and pointed wings, which give them a swallow-like appearance when seen from afar.

 Blue-cheeked bee-eater, Merops persicus 
 European bee-eater, Merops apiaster

RollersOrder: CoraciiformesFamily: Coraciidae

Rollers resemble crows in size and build, but are more closely related to the kingfishers and bee-eaters. They share the colourful appearance of those groups with blues and browns predominating. The two inner front toes are connected, but the outer toe is not.

 European roller, Coracias garrulous

WoodpeckersOrder: PiciformesFamily: Picidae

Woodpeckers are small to medium-sized birds with chisel-like beaks, short legs, stiff tails and long tongues used for capturing insects. Some species have feet with two toes pointing forward and two backward, while several species have only three toes. Many woodpeckers have the habit of tapping noisily on tree trunks with their beaks.

 Eurasian wryneck, Jynx torquilla

Falcons and caracarasOrder: FalconiformesFamily: Falconidae

Falconidae is a family of diurnal birds of prey, notably the falcons and caracaras. They differ from hawks, eagles and kites in that they kill with their beaks instead of their talons.

 Lesser kestrel, Falco naumanni
 Eurasian kestrel, Falco tinnunculus 
 Red-footed falcon, Falco vespertinus
 Amur falcon, Falco amurensis (A)
 Eleonora's falcon, Falco eleonorae 
 Sooty falcon, Falco concolor (A)
 Merlin, Falco columbarius
 Eurasian hobby, Falco subbuteo 
 Lanner falcon, Falco biarmicus (A)
 Saker falcon, Falco cherrug (A)
 Peregrine falcon, Falco peregrinus

Old world oriolesOrder: PasseriformesFamily: Oriolidae

The Old World orioles are colorful passerine birds. They are not related to the New World orioles.

 Eurasian golden oriole, Oriolus oriolus

ShrikesOrder: PasseriformesFamily: Laniidae

Shrikes are passerine birds known for their habit of catching other birds and small animals and impaling the uneaten portions of their bodies on thorns. A typical shrike's beak is hooked, like a bird of prey.

 Red-backed shrike, Lanius collurio 
 Red-tailed shrike, Lanius phoenicuroides (A)
 Isabelline shrike, Lanius isabellinus (A)
 Brown shrike, Lanius cristatus (A)
 Great gray shrike, Lanius excubitor (A)
 Lesser gray shrike, Lanius minor 
 Masked shrike, Lanius nubicus 
 Woodchat shrike, Lanius senator

Crows, jays, and magpiesOrder: PasseriformesFamily: Corvidae

The family Corvidae includes crows, ravens, jays, choughs, magpies, treepies, nutcrackers and ground jays. Corvids are above average in size among the Passeriformes, and some of the larger species show high levels of intelligence.

 Eurasian jay, Garrulus glandarius 
 Eurasian magpie, Pica pica 
 Eurasian jackdaw, Corvus monedula
 House crow, Corvus splendens (A)
 Rook, Corvus frugilegus (A)
 Hooded crow, Corvus cornix
 Brown-necked raven, Corvus ruficollis (A)
 Common raven, Corvus corax

Tits, chickadees, and titmiceOrder: PasseriformesFamily: Paridae

The Paridae are mainly small stocky woodland species with short stout bills. Some have crests. They are adaptable birds, with a mixed diet including seeds and insects.

 Coal tit, Periparus ater
 Eurasian blue tit, Cyanistes caeruleus (A)
 Great tit, Parus major

Penduline-titsOrder: PasseriformesFamily: Remizidae

The penduline-tits are a group of small passerine birds related to the true tits. They are insectivores.

 Eurasian penduline-tit, Remiz pendulinus

LarksOrder: PasseriformesFamily: Alaudidae

Larks are small terrestrial birds with often extravagant songs and display flights. Most larks are fairly dull in appearance. Their food is insects and seeds.

 Bar-tailed lark, Ammomanes cinctura (A)
 Desert lark, Ammomanes deserti (A)
 Horned lark, Eremophila alpestris (A)
 Temminck's lark, Eremophila bilopha (A)
 Greater short-toed lark, Calandrella brachydactyla 
 Bimaculated lark, Melanocorypha bimaculata (A)
 Calandra lark, Melanocorypha calandra (A)
 Dunn's lark, Eremalauda dunni (A)
 Mediterranean short-toed lark, Alaudala rufescens Turkestan short-toed lark, Alaudala heinei (A)
 Wood lark, Lullula arborea 
 Eurasian skylark, Alauda arvensis 
 Oriental skylark, Alauda gulgula (A)
 Crested lark, Galerida cristataBearded reedling
Order: PasseriformesFamily: Panuridae

This species, the only one in its family, is found in reed beds throughout temperate Europe and Asia.

 Bearded reedling, Panurus biarmicusCisticolas and allies
Order: PasseriformesFamily: Cisticolidae

The Cisticolidae are warblers found mainly in warmer southern regions of the Old World. They are generally very small birds of drab brown or gray appearance found in open country such as grassland or scrub.

 Delicate prinia, Prinia lepida (A)
 Zitting cisticola, Cisticola juncidisReed warblers and allies
Order: PasseriformesFamily: Acrocephalidae

The members of this family are usually rather large for "warblers". Most are rather plain olivaceous brown above with much yellow to beige below. They are usually found in open woodland, reedbeds, or tall grass. The family occurs mostly in southern to western Eurasia and surroundings, but it also ranges far into the Pacific, with some species in Africa.

 Eastern olivaceous warbler, Iduna pallida 
 Upcher's warbler, Hippolais languida (A)
 Olive-tree warbler, Hippolais olivetorum (A)
 Icterine warbler, Hippolais icterina (A)
 Aquatic warbler, Acrocephalus paludicola (A)
 Moustached warbler, Acrocephalus melanopogon 
 Sedge warbler, Acrocephalus schoenobaenus 
 Paddyfield warbler, Acrocephalus agricola (A)
 Blyth's reed warbler, Acrocephalus dumetorum (A)
 Marsh warbler, Acrocephalus palustris (A)
 Eurasian reed warbler, Acrocephalus scirpaceus 
 Basra reed warbler, Acrocephalus griseldis (A)
 Great reed warbler, Acrocephalus arundinaceusGrassbirds and allies
Order: PasseriformesFamily: Locustellidae

Locustellidae are a family of small insectivorous songbirds found mainly in Eurasia, Africa, and the Australian region. They are smallish birds with tails that are usually long and pointed, and tend to be drab brownish or buffy all over.

 River warbler, Locustella fluviatilis (A)
 Savi's warbler, Locustella luscinioides Common grasshopper-warbler, Locustella naevia (A)

Swallows
Order: PasseriformesFamily: Hirundinidae

The family Hirundinidae is adapted to aerial feeding. They have a slender streamlined body, long pointed wings and a short bill with a wide gape. The feet are adapted to perching rather than walking, and the front toes are partially joined at the base.

 Plain martin, Riparia paludicola (A)
 Bank swallow, Riparia riparia 
 Eurasian crag-martin, Ptyonoprogne rupestris Barn swallow, Hirundo rustica Red-rumped swallow, Cecropis daurica Common house-martin, Delichon urbicum'

Leaf warblersOrder: PasseriformesFamily: Phylloscopidae

Leaf warblers are a family of small insectivorous birds found mostly in Eurasia and ranging into Wallacea and Africa. The species are of various sizes, often green-plumaged above and yellow below, or more subdued with greyish-green to greyish-brown colours.

 Wood warbler, Phylloscopus sibilatrix 
 Eastern Bonelli's warbler, Phylloscopus orientalis 
 Yellow-browed warbler, Phylloscopus inornatus (A)
 Hume's warbler, Phylloscopus humei (A)
 Dusky warbler, Phylloscopus fuscatus (A)
 Willow warbler, Phylloscopus trochilus 
 Mountain chiffchaff, Phylloscopus sindianus (A)
 Common chiffchaff, Phylloscopus collybita

Bush warblers and alliesOrder: PasseriformesFamily: Scotocercidae

The members of this family are found throughout Africa, Asia, and Polynesia. Their taxonomy is in flux, and some authorities place some genera in other families.

 Cetti's warbler, Cettia cetti

Sylviid warblers, parrotbills, and alliesOrder: PasseriformesFamily: Sylviidae

The family Sylviidae is a group of small insectivorous passerine birds. They mainly occur as breeding species, as the common name implies, in Europe, Asia and, to a lesser extent, Africa. Most are of generally undistinguished appearance, but many have distinctive songs.

 Eurasian blackcap, Sylvia atricapilla 
 Garden warbler, Sylvia borin 
 African desert warbler, Curruca deserti (A)
 Asian desert warbler, Curruca nana (A)
 Barred warbler, Curruca nisoria 
 Lesser whitethroat, Curruca curruca 
 Eastern Orphean warbler, Curruca crassirostris
 Cyprus warbler, Curruca melanothorax 
 Menetries's warbler, Curruca mystacea (A)
 Rüppell's warbler, Curruca ruppeli 
 Eastern subalpine warbler, Curruca cantillans
 Sardinian warbler, Curruca melanocephala 
 Greater whitethroat, Curruca communis 
 Spectacled warbler, Curruca conspicillata

KingletsOrder: PasseriformesFamily: Regulidae

The kinglets, also called crests, are a small group of birds often included in the Old World warblers, but frequently given family status because they also resemble the titmice.

 Goldcrest, Regulus regulus
 Common firecrest, Regulus ignicapilla (A)

WallcreeperOrder: PasseriformesFamily: Tichodromidae

The wallcreeper is a small bird, with stunning crimson, gray and black plumage, related to the nuthatch family.

 Wallcreeper, Tichodroma muraria

TreecreepersOrder: PasseriformesFamily: Certhiidae

Treecreepers are small woodland birds, brown above and white below. They have thin pointed down-curved bills, which they use to extricate insects from bark. They have stiff tail feathers, like woodpeckers, which they use to support themselves on vertical trees.

 Short-toed treecreeper, Certhia brachydactyla

WrensOrder: PasseriformesFamily: Troglodytidae

The wrens are mainly small and inconspicuous except for their loud songs. These birds have short wings and thin down-turned bills. Several species often hold their tails upright. All are insectivorous.

 Eurasian wren, Troglodytes troglodytes

DippersOrder: PasseriformesFamily: Cinclidae

Dippers are a group of perching birds whose habitat includes aquatic environments in the Americas, Europe and Asia. They are named for their bobbing or dipping movements.

 White-throated dipper, Cinclus cinclus (Ex)

StarlingsOrder: PasseriformesFamily: Sturnidae

Starlings are small to medium-sized passerine birds. Their flight is strong and direct and they are very gregarious. Their preferred habitat is fairly open country. They eat insects and fruit. Plumage is typically dark with a metallic sheen.

 European starling, Sturnus vulgaris 
 Rosy starling, Pastor roseus (A)

Thrushes and alliesOrder: PasseriformesFamily: Turdidae

The thrushes are a group of passerine birds that occur mainly in the Old World. They are plump, soft plumaged, small to medium-sized insectivores or sometimes omnivores, often feeding on the ground. Many have attractive songs.

 Mistle thrush, Turdus viscivorus
 Song thrush, Turdus philomelos 
 Redwing, Turdus iliacus 
 Eurasian blackbird, Turdus merula
 Fieldfare, Turdus pilaris 
 Ring ouzel, Turdus torquatus (A)
 Dusky thrush, Turdus eunomus (A)
 Naumann's thrush, Turdus naumanni (A)

Old-World flycatchersOrder: PasseriformesFamily: Muscicapidae

Old World flycatchers are a large group of small passerine birds native to the Old World. They are mainly small arboreal insectivores. The appearance of these birds is highly varied, but they mostly have weak songs and harsh calls.

 Spotted flycatcher, Muscicapa striata 
 Rufous-tailed scrub-robin, Cercotrichas galactotes 
 European robin, Erithacus rubecula 
 White-throated robin, Irania gutturalis (A)
 Thrush nightingale, Luscinia luscinia (A)
 Common nightingale, Luscinia megarhynchos 
 Bluethroat, Luscinia svecica 
 Red-flanked bluetail, Tarsiger cyanurus (A)
 Red-breasted flycatcher, Ficedula parva 
 Semicollared flycatcher, Ficedula semitorquata
 European pied flycatcher, Ficedula hypoleuca 
 Collared flycatcher, Ficedula albicollis 
 Common redstart, Phoenicurus phoenicurus 
 Black redstart, Phoenicurus ochruros
 Rufous-tailed rock-thrush, Monticola saxatilis (A)
 Blue rock-thrush, Monticola solitarius 
 Whinchat, Saxicola rubetra 
 European stonechat, Saxicola rubicola 
 Siberian stonechat, Saxicola maurus (A) 
 Pied bushchat, Saxicola caprata (A)
 Northern wheatear, Oenanthe oenanthe
 Isabelline wheatear, Oenanthe isabellina 
 Hooded wheatear, Oenanthe monacha (A)
 Desert wheatear, Oenanthe deserti 
 Western black-eared wheatear, Oenanthe hispanica (A)
 Cyprus wheatear, Oenanthe cypriaca 
 Eastern black-eared wheatear, Oenanthe melanoleuca 
 Pied wheatear, Oenanthe pleschanka (A)
 White-crowned wheatear, Oenanthe leucopyga (A)
 Finsch's wheatear, Oenanthe finschii (A)
 Mourning wheatear, Oenanthe lugens (A)
 Kurdish wheatear, Oenanthe xanthoprymna (A)

WaxwingsOrder: PasseriformesFamily: Bombycillidae

The waxwings are a group of birds with soft silky plumage and unique red tips to some of the wing feathers. In the Bohemian and cedar waxwings, these tips look like sealing wax and give the group its name. These are arboreal birds of northern forests. They live on insects in summer and berries in winter.

 Bohemian waxwing, Bombycilla garrulus (A)

HypocoliusOrder: PasseriformesFamily: Hypocoliidae

The grey hypocolius is a small Middle Eastern bird with the shape and soft plumage of a waxwing. They are mainly a uniform grey colour except the males have a black triangular mask around their eyes.

 Hypocolius, Hypocolius ampelinus (A)

AccentorsOrder: PasseriformesFamily: Prunellidae

The accentors are in the only bird family, Prunellidae, which is completely endemic to the Palearctic. They are small, fairly drab species superficially similar to sparrows.

 Dunnock, Prunella modularis

Old World sparrowsOrder: PasseriformesFamily: Passeridae

Old World sparrows are small passerine birds. In general, sparrows tend to be small, plump, brown or gray birds with short tails and short powerful beaks. Sparrows are seed eaters, but they also consume small insects.

 House sparrow, Passer domesticus 
 Spanish sparrow, Passer hispaniolensis 
 Dead Sea sparrow, Passer moabiticus (A)
 Eurasian tree sparrow, Passer montanus (A)
 Rock sparrow, Petronia petronia (A)
 Pale rockfinch, Carpospiza brachydactyla (A)
 White-winged snowfinch, Montifringilla nivalis (A)

Wagtails and pipitsOrder: PasseriformesFamily: Motacillidae

Motacillidae is a family of small passerine birds with medium to long tails. They include the wagtails, longclaws and pipits. They are slender, ground feeding insectivores of open country

 Gray wagtail, Motacilla cinerea
 Western yellow wagtail, Motacilla flava
 Eastern yellow wagtail, Motacilla tschutschensis (A)
 Citrine wagtail, Motacilla citreola 
 White wagtail, Motacilla alba
 Richard's pipit, Anthus richardi (A)
 Long-billed pipit, Anthus similis (A)
 Blyth's pipit, Anthus godlewskii (A)
 Tawny pipit, Anthus campestris
 Meadow pipit, Anthus pratensis 
 Tree pipit, Anthus trivialis 
 Olive-backed pipit, Anthus hodgsoni (A)
 Red-throated pipit, Anthus cervinus 
 Water pipit, Anthus spinoletta (A)
 American pipit, Anthus rubescens (A)

Finches, euphonias, and alliesOrder: PasseriformesFamily: Fringillidae

Finches are seed-eating passerine birds, that are small to moderately large and have a strong beak, usually conical and in some species very large. All have twelve tail feathers and nine primaries. These birds have a bouncing flight with alternating bouts of flapping and gliding on closed wings, and most sing well.

 Common chaffinch, Fringilla coelebs 
 Brambling, Fringilla montifringilla (A)
 Hawfinch, Coccothraustes coccothraustes 
 Common rosefinch, Carpodacus erythrinus (A)
 Eurasian bullfinch, Pyrrhula pyrrhula (A)
 Crimson-winged finch, Rhodopechys sanguineus (A)
 Trumpeter finch, Bucanetes githagineus (A)
 Desert finch, Rhodospiza obsoleta (A)
 European greenfinch, Chloris chloris 
 Eurasian linnet, Linaria cannabina 
 Common redpoll, Acanthis flammea (A)
 Red crossbill, Loxia curvirostra 
 European goldfinch, Carduelis carduelis
 European serin, Serinus serinus
 Fire-fronted serin, Serinus pusillus (A)
 Eurasian siskin, Spinus spinus 

Old World buntingsOrder: PasseriformesFamily''': Emberizidae

The emberizids are a large family of passerine birds. They are seed-eating birds with distinctively shaped bills. Many emberizid species have distinctive head patterns.

 Black-headed bunting, Emberiza melanocephala 
 Corn bunting, Emberiza calandra Rock bunting, Emberiza cia (A)
 Yellowhammer, Emberiza citrinella (A)
 Pine bunting, Emberiza leucocephalos (A)
 Gray-necked bunting, Emberiza buchanani (A)
 Cinereous bunting, Emberiza cineracea (A)
 Ortolan bunting, Emberiza hortulana 
 Cretzschmar's bunting, Emberiza caesia 
 Striolated bunting, Emberiza striolata (A)
 Reed bunting, Emberiza schoeniclus Yellow-breasted bunting, Emberiza aureola (A)
 Little bunting, Emberiza pusilla (A)
 Rustic bunting, Emberiza rustica (A)

See also
List of birds
Lists of birds by region

References

"Splitting headaches? Recent taxonomic changes affecting the British and Western Palaearctic lists" - Martin Collinson, British Birds'' vol 99 (June 2006), 306-323

Lists of birds by country
Lists of birds of Asia
Lists of birds of Europe
Birds
Birds